The All India Bakchod Knockout, a.k.a. AIB Knockout was a celebrity roast adaptation created by Mumbai based creative agency All India Bakchod (AIB). It was performed and filmed in December, 2014, and was uploaded on their YouTube channel on January 28, 2015. It was recorded at the NSCI Dome in Worli. It was hosted by Karan Johar, Ranveer Singh and Arjun Kapoor were roasted. The show was subsequently removed from their channel on February 3, 2015. AIB removed the show because it attracted widespread public backlash from religious groups, Bollywood actors, and certain right-wing political activists.

Cast

Reception 
In February, 2015, the show was subject to widespread public criticism and certain right-wing political leaders filled an FIR against the group, the participants and certain audience members, under multiple sections of the Indian Penal Code. No progress or arrests were made in any of the cases. Some dissenters protested outside AIB's office displaying their displeasure at the show's content. AIB offered apologies to those who were aggrieved and issued a two page press-release explaining their decision to remove the video from their channel.

Multiple Bollywood celebrities expressed both their displeasure at the content and positive support in favor of artistic freedom. The hype surrounding the show eventually ended by April, 2015, and to work on their goodwill, AIB's next YouTube upload was a call to action sketch that urged people to fight for Net Neutrality in India.

References 

Roast (comedy)
2015 YouTube videos
2015 films